Fresgoe is the main harbour for the village of Reay, overlooking Sandside Bay in Caithness in the Scottish highlands. It was built in the early 1830s, by a Major William Innes, primarily to encourage fishing and was also used on the north coast trading route.

References

Populated places in Caithness
Ports and harbours of Scotland